SCQ Reload is a Philippine youth-oriented drama aired on ABS-CBN which starred the former teen finalists or questors of the reality talent search Star Circle Quest, in which "SCQ" was also derived. It aired from July 12, 2004 to June 12, 2005.

It tackles the story of normal teenagers with their adventures and struggles in life and love.

On its first few seasons the show was entitled SCQ Reload: OK Ako! ("I'm okay!") with the complete former final 10 SCQ finalists, and on a new season, the title was changed to SCQ Reload: Kilig Ako! ("I'm kilig!") which excluded Sandara Park due to some commitments, and added new casts like Sarah Geronimo and Japoy Lizardo and guests appearance of Kathryn Bernardo and Joshua Dionisio.

Originally, SCQ Reload aired every weekdays at 5:30pm then moved to its timeslot every Sunday at 3:00pm in the 3rd quarter of 2004.

Cast

Ok Ako! (2004)

Main cast
 Hero Angeles as Hero Roxas
 Sandara Park as Sandara Soh
 Joross Gamboa as Joross Pimentel
 Roxanne Guinoo as Roxanne Roxas
 Melissa Ricks as Melissa Gordon
 Michelle Madrigal as Michelle Revilla
 Joseph Bitangcol as Joseph Fernando
 Neri Naig as Nerizza Santiago
 Raphael Martinez as RJ Roxas
 Errol Abalayan as Errol Roxas

Kilig Ako! (2005)

Main cast
 Sarah Geronimo as Sarah
 Hero Angeles as Hero Roxas
 Roxanne Guinoo as Roxanne Roxas
 Joross Gamboa as Joross Pimentel
 Melissa Ricks as Melissa Gordon
 Michelle Madrigal as Michelle Revilla
 Joseph Bitangcol as Joseph Fernando
 Neri Naig as Nerizza Santiago
 Raphael Martinez as RJ Roxas
 Errol Abalayan as Errol Roxas
 Jason Abalos as Jason
 Janelle Quintana as Janelle
 Japoy Lizardo 
 Charles Christianson

Supporting cast
 Jaclyn Jose as Helen Roxas
 John Arcilla as Dennis Roxas
 Lani Mercado as Tina Roxas
 Bernadette Allyson as Judith Revilla
 Menggie Cobarrubias as Mateo Fernando
 Jennifer Sevilla as Pascuala Fernando
 Ricky Davao as Teodoro Fernando
 Giselle Sanchez as Wang So
 Beverly Salviejo as Leona
 Ya Chang as Himself 
 Marla Boyd as Trixie
 Vanessa Grindrud as Tootsie
 DM Sevilla as DM

Guest Cast
 Kathryn Bernardo as Jobelle
 Joshua Dionisio as Adolfo

Trivia
In 2005, First "Grand Teen Questor" Hero Angeles controversially left the network and his contract Star Magic after the end of the show and in the following year, Errol Abalayan also left the showbiz by continuing his studies without continuing his own acting.

See also
List of shows previously aired by ABS-CBN
Star Magic
Star Circle Quest

ABS-CBN drama series
2004 Philippine television series debuts
2005 Philippine television series endings
Filipino-language television shows
English-language television shows
Korean-language television shows